Leon Wiśniewski (29 March 1937 – 27 April 1985) was a Polish field hockey player. He competed in the men's tournament at the 1960 Summer Olympics.

References

External links
 

1937 births
1985 deaths
Polish male field hockey players
Olympic field hockey players of Poland
Field hockey players at the 1960 Summer Olympics
People from Gniezno
People from Poznań Voivodeship (1921–1939)